Butylated hydroxyanisole (BHA) is a synthetic, waxy, solid petrochemical. Its antioxidant properties have caused it to be widely used as a preservative in food, food packaging, animal feed, cosmetics, pharmaceuticals, rubber, and petroleum products. BHA has been used in food since around 1947.

Chemistry
BHA consists of a mixture of two isomeric organic compounds, 2-tert-butyl-4-hydroxyanisole and 3-tert-butyl-4-hydroxyanisole. It is prepared from 4-methoxyphenol and isobutylene.

The conjugated aromatic ring of BHA is able to stabilize free radicals, sequestering them. By acting as free radical scavengers, further free radical reactions are prevented.

Applications
Since 1947, BHA has been added to edible fats and fat-containing foods for its antioxidant properties as it prevents rancidification of food which creates objectionable odors. It has been assigned the E number E320. It is often combined with a similar chemical, butylated hydroxytoluene (BHT).

BHA also is commonly used in medicines, such as cholecalciferol (Vitamin D3), isotretinoin, lovastatin, and simvastatin, among others.

Health Effects
The U.S. National Institutes of Health report that BHA is reasonably anticipated to be a human carcinogen based on evidence of carcinogenicity in experimental animals. In particular, when administered in high doses as part of their diet, BHA causes papillomas and squamous cell carcinomas of the forestomach in rats and Syrian golden hamsters.  In mice, there is no carcinogenic effect; in fact, there is evidence of a protective effect against the carcinogenicity of other chemicals.

When examining human population statistics, the usual low intake levels of BHA show no significant association with an increased risk of cancer. The state of California has, however, listed BHA as a carcinogen.

The European Commission has conducted an evaluation of literature. They noted the lack of potential for the compound to induce carcinogenic effects in humans; studies showing carcinogenic effects in hamsters are not relevant to humans (which lack a forestomach). Also noted is that endocrine disruption, if any, is only likely to be present at levels vastly exceeding the intake as a food. 

The International Agency for Research on Cancer (IARC) - Summaries & Evaluations stated Butylated hydroxyanisole was tested for carcinogenicity in two experiments in rats and in two experiments in hamsters by administration in the diet, inducing benign and malignant tumours of the forestomach. 

One of its metabolites is TBHQ (t-butylhydroquinone), a preservative made infamous by food writer Michael Pollan.

See also 
 Anisole
 Butylated hydroxytoluene (BHT)

References 

Phenols
Food antioxidants
IARC Group 2B carcinogens
Alkylphenols
Tert-butyl compounds
E-number additives